Gertrude Elizabeth Nye Dorry (1908–2004) was an American linguist, author and Peace Corps Educator. 

Nye was raised in the United States. She spent much of her adult life in Iran. Early in her life she was a school teacher in New Hampshire. Later while at the University of Michigan she met a man from Iran, and after their marriage they moved to Iran in 1955. She was Peace Corps Project Manager for Iran from 1966-1969.

She received the Iranian Royal Book of the Year Award from Shah of Iran for writing English teaching books for Iranian students.

Books
 Games for second language learning, McGraw-Hill, 1966

References

American expatriates in Iran
Linguists from the United States
Women linguists
1908 births
2004 deaths
University of Michigan alumni
University of New Hampshire alumni